Andrés Hurtado de Mendoza y Cabrera, 3rd Marquis of Cañete (c. 1500 – March 30, 1561) was a Spanish military officer and, from June 29, 1556 to his death on March 30, 1561, the third Viceroy of Peru.

Biography

Origins and military career
Andrés Hurtado de Mendoza was born at Cañete into a high-ranking Spanish noble family. He was a descendant of Juan Hurtado de Mendoza, Señor de Mendívil. Hurtado was guarda mayor (governor) of Cuenca, Spain, and royal chief huntsman of Castile, succeeding his father in both those positions. He was also a military officer, serving with distinction in actions in Granada, France and Flanders. He accompanied the Emperor, Charles V, to Germany and Flanders.

After being named viceroy of Peru in 1555, he arrived at Panama, at that time part of the Viceroyalty of Peru. Here he delayed his journey to deal with a rebellion of fugitive black slaves. He put Pedro de Ursúa in charge of the suppression of the rebels.

Viceroy of Peru
He arrived in Lima on June 29, 1556, finding a colony still recovering from the rebellions of Sebastian del Castillo, Godinez, and Girón. The Audiencia had been ruling for nearly four years, with its president, Melchor Bravo de Saravia, serving as interim viceroy. The judges of the Audiencia had disputes among themselves, and they were arrogant towards the new viceroy. Hurtado immediately petitioned the king for the removal of the most offensive. Elsewhere in the colony, the pardoned insurgents were restive, and loyal royalists were agitating for greater rewards. There were still some centers of Inca resistance. In the face of this turbulence, Hurtado adopted despotic measures, executing many of the former rebels and banishing many of the discontented government supporters.

Among his other security measures were the creation of a permanent guard in Lima, and the construction of additional galleys to guard the coast.

He founded the College of San Juan de la Penitencia in Lima for poor Mestizo girls, and another college at Trujillo. He also endowed the recently founded University of Lima. He founded the Hospital of San Andrés, also at Lima, and had the mummies of the Incas Viracocha, Yupanqui, and Huayna Capac moved there. In 1558 he founded the city of Cuenca, near the former Inca royal residence of Tomebampa (Ecuador). In Chile he founded the cities of Mendoza and Osorno (1559), and the Audiencia of Chuquisaca.

Also in 1558, the viceroy sent out several exploring expeditions, intended also as punitive forces against bands of adventurers. He entrusted the pacification of the Amazon to his faithful supporter Pedro de Ursúa, and the conquest of the Chiriguanos and the plains of Condorillo to Andrés Manso.

He named his son García, 22 years old at the time, governor of Chile. In 1557 the Portuguese Enrique Garcés discovered the mineral mercury in Huancavélica, necessary for the extraction of silver.

Still in 1558 he reestablished the local jurisdiction of native chiefs. On January 5, 1560 he met with the last grandson of Huayna Capac, Sayri Tupac Inca in Lima. Sayri Tupac renounced his claim to the Inca Empire and accepted baptism, as Diego. In return he received the title of Prince of Yucay, with a rich revenue.

Hurtado prohibited the sale of alcoholic beverages to the Indigenous.

Meanwhile, complaints about Hurtado's arbitrary and cruel governance, especially from those he had exiled, caused King Philip II to remove him from office. (Other complaints against Hurtado were the lack of control of the economy, and the garroting of Captain Robles in his own bed.) In his place, the king appointed Diego López de Zúñiga, 4th Count of Nieva. López arrived at Paita in January 1561. His communications with Hurtado before reaching Lima were disrespectful. Hurtado fell sick and died in Lima, before López arrived the capital. He was interred in the Cathedral of Cuenca, in Spain.

Descendants
In 1532, the Marquis married Magdalena Manrique y Luna, daughter of García Fernandez Manrique, 3rd Count of Osorno and of his third wife María de Luna y Bobadilla, with whom he had seventeen children.

By Magdalena Manrique:
 Diego Hurtado de Mendoza, 4th Marquis of Cañete
 García Hurtado de Mendoza, 5th Marquis of Cañete (1535–1609)
 Francisco de Mendoza, Archbishop of Burgos
 Pedro de Mendoza
 Rodrigo Hurtado de Mendoza y Pacheco, 1st Lord of Fregenal de la Sierra
 Fernando de Mendoza
 Juan Hurtado de Mendoza
 Alvaro de Mendoza
 Andrés de Mendoza
 Felipe de Mendoza
 María de Mendoza
 Francisca de Mendoza
 Teresa de Mendoza

Ancestry

References

Sources

1500 births
1561 deaths
Year of birth uncertain
People from the Province of Cuenca
Viceroys of Peru
Andres 03
Knights of Santiago
Spanish generals
Andres 03
16th-century Spanish nobility